The Government of Barbados contains a number of government ministries which control and govern various aspects of the country. Barbados currently has around 30 ministries, each with its appointed Minister.

Current Structure of Government Ministries
Prime Minister's Office
Ministry of the Public Service
Ministry of Finance, Economic Affairs and Investment
Office of the Attorney General
Ministry of Legal Affairs 
Ministry of Education, Technological and Vocational Training
Ministry of Housing, Lands and Rural Development 
Ministry of Foreign Affairs and Foreign Trade
Ministry of International Business and Industry 
Ministry of Environment and National Beautification 
Ministry of People Empowerment and Elder Affairs 
Ministry of Tourism and International Transport 
Ministry of Transport Works and Maintenance
Ministry of Health and Wellness
Ministry of Home Affairs
Ministry of Small Business, Entrepreneurship and Commerce 
Ministry of Energy and Water Resources
Ministry of Labour and Social Partnership Relations
Ministry of Youth and Community Empowerment
Ministry of Maritime Affairs and the Blue Economy 
Ministry of Agriculture and Food Security
Ministry of Creative Economy, Culture and Sports 
Ministry of Innovation, Science and Smart Technology 
Ministry of Information, Broadcasting and Public Affairs

References

https://www.gov.bb/government-main/directory/ministry-of-housing-and-lands/

Barbados
Ministries